Carny, also spelled carnie, is an informal term used in North America for a traveling carnival employee, and the language they use, particularly when the employee operates a game ("joint"), food stand ("grab", "popper" or "floss wagon"), or ride ("ride jock") at a carnival. The term "showie" is used synonymously in Australia, while "showman" is used in the United Kingdom.

Etymology
Carny is thought to have become popularized around 1931 in North America, when it was first colloquially used to describe one who works at a carnival. The word carnival, originally meaning a "time of merrymaking before Lent" and referring to a time denoted by lawlessness (often ritualised under a lord of misrule figure and intended to show the consequences of social chaos), came into use around 1549.

Carny language

The carny vocabulary is traditionally part of carnival cant, a secret language. It is an ever-changing form of communication, in large part designed to be impossible to understand by an outsider. As words are assimilated into the culture at large, they lose their function and are replaced by more obscure or insular terms. Most carnies no longer use cant, but some owners/operators and "old-timers" ("half yarders") still use some of the classic terms.

In addition to carny jargon, some carnival workers used a special infix ("earz" or "eez" or "iz") to render regular language unintelligible to outsiders. This style eventually migrated into wrestling, hip hop, and other parts of modern culture.

The British form of fairground cant is called "polari".

Usage in popular culture

Film
 Freaks is a 1932 thriller which centers around the lives of carnival workers and features several real-life carnival performers in the cast.
 Torture Garden is a 1967 British horror film with Burgess Meredith as a carny later revealed to be The Devil.
 Carnies is a 2007 movie directed by Brian Corder and starring Chris Staviski, Doug Jones, Reggie Bannister, and Lee Perkins.
 Nightmare Alley is a 1947 movie starring Tyrone Power and directed by Edmund Goulding, adapted from the novel of the same name by William Lindsay Gresham, which chronicles the rise and fall of a carny con man. There is also a 2021 remake starring Bradley Cooper and directed by Guillermo del Toro.
 In the 1988 movie Two Moon Junction, Richard Tyson plays a carny who falls in love with a rich, southern socialite (Sherilyn Fenn).
 Carny is a 1980 movie directed by Robert Kaylor and starring Gary Busey, Jodie Foster, Robbie Robertson, and Meg Foster. It has become a cult favorite.
 In the 1997 movie Austin Powers, Austin claims he only fears two things, nuclear war and carnies.
Girl on the Bridge (La Fille sur le pont) is a 1999 French film shot in black and white and directed by Patrice Leconte, starring Daniel Auteuil and Vanessa Paradis. It is about a knife thrower who recruits a female assistant for his shows.
 In the 2007 movie Ghost Rider (2007 film), Johnny Blaze played by Nicolas Cage is referred to as a carnie.
 In the 2013 film We're the Millers, Emma Roberts' character Casey meets a carny named Scotty P, played by Mark L. Young, who works a "Monkey Maze" at the local fair. However, he doesn't know the meaning of the word, and when asked whether he is a carny, he responds: "I drive a motorcycle".
 in the 2022 film Elvis, Colonel Tom Parker speaks in Ciazarn to some of the carnival workers when preparing for Hank Snow’s trip to the next town
 In The Bob's Burgers Movie, released in 2022, the plot revolves around the murder of a carny named Cotton Candy Dan. The children visit the carnies' section of town, when investigating the murder.

Television
 In The Blacklist season 5, episode 1, two carnies speak carny among each other, and Raymond Reddington says he understands some carny. In season 5, episode 11, Reddington speaks carny to an associate while being involved in illegal dealings.
 In The Simpsons episode "Bart Carny", Bart Simpson and Homer Simpson are forced to work as carnies after Bart destroys Hitler's car. After failing to bribe Police Chief Chief Wiggum, the ring toss game that they are fraudulently running is shut down. Throughout the episode carny jargon is used. One of the carnies is voiced by Jim Varney.
 The fourth season of Heroes features several characters that live and work in a traveling carnival.
 The HBO series "Carnivàle" centered around a traveling carnival in the American Southwest during the 1930s.
 Patrick Jane, the title character of the CBS crime drama The Mentalist, was raised as a carny.
 In The Fairly Odd Parents episode "The Grass is Greener", Timmy Turner feels unwanted at home and decides to run away to a carnival. There he is met by several carnies and quickly outperforms them.

Music
 Carny is a psychedelic blues band from Austin, Texas formed in 2005 featuring Paul Leary, guitarist of Butthole Surfers and producer of Sublime, Meat Puppets, Reverend Horton Heat, also featuring drummer Sam McCandless from the band Cold. Singer-songwriter Formica Iglesia, on vocals, fronts the band.
 "The Carny" is a song from Nick Cave and the Bad Seeds on the album Your Funeral... My Trial.
 The Joni Mitchell song "That Song About The Midway" depicted the singer falling in love with a carny and following the show from town to town.
 Carney is a 1972 album by Leon Russell.
 Carny Man by Cross Canadian Ragweed.
 "Rusholme Ruffians," released on the album Meat is Murder (1985) by The Smiths, recounts a schoolgirl's infatuation with a greasy-haired carney, a "speedway operator": It "is all a tremulous heart requires." After her advances are denied, she wonders, "How quickly would I die if I jumped from the top of the parachutes?"

Literature
 In Michael Kurland's The Unicorn Girl, one of the Greenwich Village Trilogy, first published in 1969, some of the main characters are from a carny travelling between the stars in an alternate universe. Sylvia, one of the travellers, uses carny cant when she and one of the two Earth-born protagonists go into a carnival apparently in Earth's 20th century.
 In Robert A. Heinlein's Stranger in a Strange Land, the protagonist Michael spends some time living with carnies.
 In Theodore Sturgeon's novel The Dreaming Jewels, the hero flees with carnies to escape a brutal father. The head carny collects unusual people because he has discovered strange jewels that create people as works of art. Sturgeon himself worked as a carny for a time.
 Barry Longyear's Circus World books Circus World, City of Baraboo and Elephant Song are science fiction, set on a planet populated by the descendants of a crashed space-going circus, with preserved and evolved carny culture elements including performance as a means of barter.
 The 2013 Stephen King novel Joyland is set in a 1970s American amusement park and makes reference to "carnies".
 The 2005 Bryan Johnson and Walter Flanagan comic book series Karney follows the exploits of a murderous band of "carnies" who travel from town to town slaughtering the residents with the intention of turning them into barbecue meat.

Theater
 In Liliom by Ferenc Molnár the main character is a carnival Carousel Barker.
 In Carousel by Rodgers and Hammerstein, based on Liliom the main character, Billy Bigelow is a Carnival Carousel Barker.

Other
 Much of the fiction of pulp writer Fredric Brown features carnies and touches on carnival life, in particular the Ed and Am Hunter mysteries, beginning with The Fabulous Clipjoint in 1947.
 Carnival Games (known in Europe as Carnival: Funfair Games) is a video game made for the Nintendo Wii and Nintendo DS featuring a carny who helps to present and explain gameplay.
 Many Carny words are still used by professional wrestlers, e.g. mark, work, snozz, et al. Pro wrestling originated in the carnivals of the 19th and early 20th century, where wrestlers not wanting to face regular injury and wanting to make bouts more entertaining would "stage" their fights. Carny language was used to disguise the staged nature of the bouts with all involved keeping "kayfabe" or protecting the secret.
 Ron Bennington a formal carnival worker and stand up comedian states to his radio partner, "All the world is just carnies and rubes."  Insisting you're either part of the gimmick or "a pigeon walking down the midway, enjoying his cotton candy, waiting to lose his rent money on the midway".

See also
 Romani people
 Mardi Gras
 Showman

References

Further reading

External links

 CBC Archives – A 1971 look at Conkin Shows.

Carnivals
Itinerant living
Nomads
Slang
Circus_films

fr:Forain